The Wild Dreams Tour, originally known as the Stadiums in the Summer Tour, is the current concert tour by Irish pop vocal group, Westlife. It was first scheduled to begin on 17 June 2020 in Scarborough, England at the Scarborough Open Air Theatre.

However, the tour was ultimately postponed in the wake of the COVID-19 pandemic. The band have rescheduled their dates like the Wembley Stadium, Cork and Scarborough to 2022. The first 17 other tour dates announced have been cancelled but 2 of it were rescheduled. Their three shows in Singapore made them the first international group to perform at Singapore Indoor Stadium thrice in one tour. On 19 November 2022, band member Nicky Byrne was involved in a stage fall accident during the concert. On 25 November 2022, band member Mark Feehily pulled out of the remaining shows of the UK and Ireland leg due to contracting pneumonia. He would rejoin the band for the 2023 legs.

Set list 
This set list is representative of the 8 and 9 July 2022 shows at the Aviva Stadium. It does not represent all dates of the tour.

 "Starlight"
 "Uptown Girl"
 "When You're Looking Like That"
 "Fool Again"
 "If I Let You Go"
 "My Love"
 "Swear It Again"
 ABBA Medley: "Mamma Mia" / "Gimme Gimme Gimme" / "Money Money Money" / "Take a Chance on Me" / "I Have a Dream" / "Dancing Queen" / "Waterloo" / "Thank You for the Music"
"What About Now"
 "Mandy"
 Medley: "What Makes a Man" / "Queen of My Heart" / "Unbreakable" / "I'm Already There"
 "World of Our Own"
 "Flying Without Wings"

Encore
"Hello My Love"
 "You Raise Me Up"

Notes 
 "Safe" was performed at the July 1 and 2 shows in Kent and Colchester.
 "I Lay My Love on You" and "Seasons in the Sun" were performed during the 2023 Asian Leg of the tour, in place of "What Makes a Man", "Queen of My Heart", "Unbreakable" and "I'm Already There".

Tour dates

Cancelled dates

Recordings 
 The Wembley Stadium show was shown live in cinemas across the UK, and Europe. Recorded filming and showing was also available in Hong Kong, Indonesia, Malaysia, and the Philippines.
 Westlife: Live At Wembley Stadium was also shown on ITV 1 on the 20th November 2022.

Notes 
1.This concert was part of the 2022 Singapore Grand Prix.
2.This concert sets a record for Westlife as the first international group to perform three nights at the Singapore Indoor Stadium.

Personnel

Vocals 

Nicky Byrne
Kian Egan
Mark Feehily (Absent after Manchester show until 2023 leg due to contracting pneumonia.)
Shane Filan

Band 

 Simon Ellis - Keyboards / Musical Director
 Phil Short  - Guitars
 Dishan Abrahams - Bass
 Julien Brown - Drums

Crew 

 Simon Ellis - Musical Director

Notes

References

External links 
 

2022 concert tours
Westlife concert tours
Concert tours postponed due to the COVID-19 pandemic